Ryan James Stoa (born April 13, 1987) is an American professional ice hockey left wing who is currently playing under contract with the Nürnberg Ice Tigers of the Deutsche Eishockey Liga (DEL).

Playing career

Amateur
Stoa was drafted in the 2nd round (34th overall) in the 2005 NHL Entry Draft by the Colorado Avalanche. Prior to being drafted, Ryan played high school hockey at Bloomington Kennedy High School, earning All-Lake Conference Honorable Mention honors during the 2002–03 season. He was then selected to the U.S. Development Program playing in the Under 17 and 18 National Team from 2003–2005.

Stoa committed to play collegiate hockey for the University of Minnesota in the Western Collegiate Hockey Association. In 2005–06, his freshman year, Stoa finished second to Phil Kessel in freshman scoring with 25 points for the Golden Gophers. At the start of the 2007–08 season, in his junior year, Stoa was redshirted when he suffered a season-ending knee injury.  In the following season, Stoa returned as the Gophers captain to lead the WCHA in scoring with 46 points in 36 games to be named the Gophers Most Valuable Player. Stoa was also selected to the WCHA First All-Star Team and named first-team All-American by the American Hockey Coaches Association, College Hockey News and Inside College Hockey. On March 27, 2009, Stoa forwent his senior year and signed a two-year, entry-level contract with the Colorado Avalanche.

Professional
Despite making an impression with the Avalanche in the pre-season, Stoa was assigned to the Avalanche's AHL affiliate, the Lake Erie Monsters to begin the 2009–10 season. On October 13, 2009, he scored his first professional goal with Lake Erie against the San Antonio Rampage in a 4–1 defeat. Stoa made his NHL debut with the Avalanche against the Calgary Flames on December 13, 2009. In his fifth recall to the Avalanche, Stoa scored his first NHL goal in a 5–2 defeat to the Chicago Blackhawks on April 9, 2010. Stoa finished the season scoring 40 points with the Monsters, co-leading the AHL with 23 goals among rookies.

On July 7, 2012, Stoa signed as a free agent to a one-year deal with the Washington Capitals. Assigned to AHL affiliate, the Hershey Bears, for the 2012–13 season, Stoa missed two-months to injury before returning to finish with 19 points in 46 games. On April 15, 2013, Stoa was re-signed by the Capitals on a one-year extension.

For a second successive season within the Capitals organization, Stoa was assigned to the Bears to begin the 2013–14 season. In 67 games, Stoa matched his career high 40 points from his rookie campaign and was recalled by the Capitals in the latter half of the season. He made his debut with Washington, marking a return to the NHL after a two-year absence, in a 6–4 defeat to the Philadelphia Flyers on March 5, 2014. In his three-game stint with the Capital, Stoa was scoreless.

On July 15, 2014, Stoa opted to sign abroad as a free agent on a one-year deal with Russian club, Metallurg Novokuznetsk of the KHL. In his debut season, Stoa established himself amongst the forwards, contributing with 15 goals and 30 points in 60 games. He was signed to a one-year extension during the 2014–15 season on February 27, 2015.

In the following 2015–16 season, Stoa was elevated to the leadership group amongst Metallurg. Despite the club languishing in the standings, he was leading the club with 15 goals in just 33 games before he was traded to Neftekhimik Nizhnekamsk for financial considerations on November 21, 2015. Following the 2015–16 season, he transferred from Nizhnekamsk to fellow KHL team HC Spartak Moscow.

Following the 2017–18 season, his second with Spartak, Stoa left as a free agent to sign a one-year contract with his fourth KHL club, Traktor Chelyabinsk on May 23, 2018.

After five well travelled seasons in the KHL, Stoa left Russia as a free agent, opting to continue his career in Sweden by agreeing to a one-year contract with Örebro HK of the SHL on July 15, 2019.

As a free agent heading into the start of the 2020–21 season, Stoa opted to remain in the SHL, signing with HV71 on December 2, 2020. After 11 scoreless games with HV71, Stoa was released from his contract and transferred to fellow SHL club, Djurgårdens IF. He made 13 appearances, posting 3 goals and 8 points, before leaving the club following a first-round playoff exit.

On June 30, 2021, Stoa left Sweden and signed a one-year contract with German club, Nürnberg Ice Tigers of the DEL.

International play

A part of the U.S. development program, Stoa was named to the United States Team for the 2005 U18 World Championships. Using his imposing frame, Stoa recorded 3 assists in 6 games to help the U.S. capture Gold. Stoa was also named to the U.S. Team for the 2007 World Junior Championships in Mora, Sweden. Stoa played a checking role with the Americans, and scored 2 points in 7 games to help earn Bronze.

Career statistics

Regular season and playoffs

International

Awards and honors

References

External links

1987 births
American men's ice hockey centers
Colorado Avalanche draft picks
Colorado Avalanche players
Djurgårdens IF Hockey players
Hershey Bears players
HV71 players
Ice hockey players from Minnesota
Sportspeople from Bloomington, Minnesota
Lake Erie Monsters players
Living people
Metallurg Novokuznetsk players
Minnesota Golden Gophers men's ice hockey players
HC Neftekhimik Nizhnekamsk players
Nürnberg Ice Tigers players
Olympic ice hockey players of the United States
Örebro HK players
Ice hockey players at the 2018 Winter Olympics
HC Spartak Moscow players
Traktor Chelyabinsk players
USA Hockey National Team Development Program players
Washington Capitals players
AHCA Division I men's ice hockey All-Americans